Crawford I. Henry (born May 30, 1937, in Atlanta, Georgia) is a former professional tennis player.

A high school tennis star in Georgia, Henry won the high school championship as a Freshman, Sophomore, Junior, and Senior.  He never lost a match in high school and won the National High School tournament in 1955. He went on to Tulane University where he was a two-time first-team All American in 1959 and 1960, and second-team All-American in 1957. He helped Tulane win the NCAA team title in 1959, and reach the finals in 1957. He paired with Ronald Holmberg to win NCAA doubles titles in 1957 and 1959.

Henry also reached the singles final of the tournament in Cincinnati in 1960, falling to Miguel Olvera of Ecuador. He also reached the doubles final in 1957.

Henry was enshrined into Tulane's Athletic Hall of Fame in 1983, as well as the ITA Collegiate Men's Tennis Hall of Fame in 2000. He also was the head tennis coach at North Carolina State University for 16 years. He also Coached Tennis at Emory University 1964–1967.

Henry played in Wimbledon twice in the early 1960s and reached the ranking of No. 10 in the U.S. and World No. 18. He also reached as high as U.S. No. 4 in doubles. In 1961, Henry defeated Roy Emerson who was ranked No. 1 in the world at the time.

References

1937 births
Living people
American male tennis players
Tennis players from Atlanta
Tennis people from Georgia (U.S. state)
Tulane Green Wave men's tennis players
NC State Wolfpack men's tennis coaches
Emory Eagles men's tennis coaches
American tennis coaches